Teresita Santiago Lazaro (born November 18, 1942) commonly known as Ningning Lazaro is a Filipina educator, businesswoman, and politician who served as the governor of Laguna from 2001 to 2010. Previously, she served as Vice Governor of the province from 1995 until 2001, member of the Laguna Provincial Board from the 2nd District from 1992 until 1995, Vice Mayor of Calamba, Laguna from 1988 until 1992, and the member of the Calamba Municipal Council from 1986 until 1988.

Political career
Lazaro started her career in public service from 1964 to 1974 as a public elementary school teacher in Cabuyao and later in Calamba, her hometown. Her notable achievement in business became the prime factor in her appointment as municipal councilor of Calamba by President Corazon C. Aquino in 1986.

This was followed by her election as Calamba's vice mayor in 1988 to 1992. “Shooting like a bright star” in the 1992 elections, she was voted overwhelmingly as member of the Provincial Board representing the 2nd district of Laguna, comprising the municipalities of Calamba, Los Baños, Bay, and Cabuyao.

With the death of the late Gov. Felicisimo T. San Luis in 1992, then Board Member Lazaro assumed the post of vice-governor since she topped the list of elected board members.

In the 1995 elections, Vice Governor Lazaro teamed-up with then-Senator Jose D. Lina, Jr., who ran for governor. The tandem won unanimously and both were once again re-elected during the 1998 elections. When President Gloria Macapagal Arroyo appointed Governor Joey Lina in 2001 as secretary of the Department of the Interior and Local Government, Vice Governor Lazaro took on the responsibility of governing one of the nation's fastest growing provinces. She took her oath as Laguna's first female governor on January 30, 2001.

She was formally elected governor of the province when the Comelec proclaimed her winner in the Laguna gubernatorial race during the May 2001 election where she won by a landslide, becoming the first lady chief executive of Laguna. This was followed by her re-election for her second term in 2004 and her last and final term in 2007. Her term as governor ended in 2010. She was succeeded by E.R. Ejercito, nephew of former president Joseph Estrada.

In the 2013 elections, she attempted a comeback to politics by running for representative of the 2nd district of Laguna. However, she lost to outgoing Calamba mayor Jun Chipeco

References

1942 births
Living people
Lakas–CMD politicians
People from Calamba, Laguna
Governors of Laguna (province)
Members of the Laguna Provincial Board
Women provincial governors of the Philippines
Filipino schoolteachers
20th-century Filipino educators